Wali Rainer (born April 19, 1977) is a former American football linebacker in the National Football League. He was drafted by the Cleveland Browns in the fourth round of the 1999 NFL Draft. He played college football at Virginia.

Rainer also played for the Jacksonville Jaguars, Detroit Lions, and Houston Texans.

Professional career

Cleveland Browns
Rainer was drafted by the Cleveland Browns in the fourth round of the 1999 NFL Draft. Rainer had a great rookie season leading the Browns in tackles with 136. He remained the Browns starting middle linebacker for the next two years recording 117 tackles in 2000 and 82 tackles in 2001.

Jacksonville Jaguars
On April 20, 2002, the Browns traded Rainer along with the 79th overall pick of the 2002 NFL Draft to the Jacksonville Jaguars for the 76th overall pick of the 2002 NFL Draft. In his only season with the Jaguars he started 14 of 16 games at middle linebacker for the team and recorded 92 tackles.

Detroit Lions
On April 2, 2003 Rainer signed with the Detroit Lions. He played for the Lions from 2003 to 2005. He recorded 69 tackles during the three years.

Houston Texans
On April 4, 2006, he signed with the Houston Texans but was injured and placed on the injured reserve and never played a game for the team.

External links
Detroit Lions bio

1977 births
Living people
American football linebackers
Virginia Cavaliers football players
Cleveland Browns players
Jacksonville Jaguars players
Detroit Lions players
Houston Texans players
Players of American football from North Carolina
People from Rockingham, North Carolina